"Lu:na/Oasis" is a single released by Gackt on June 30, 2003 under Nippon Crown. Both songs are themes for the anime OVA New Fist of the North Star. The single peaked at fifth place on the Oricon weekly chart and charted for five weeks.

Track listing

References

2003 singles
Gackt songs